Joe Reed (born January 8, 1948) is a former professional American football quarterback in the National Football League (NFL). He played for the San Francisco 49ers (1972–1974) and the Detroit Lions (1975–1979). He recorded an album of standards with the 49ers' cheerleading squad, then known as the Niner Nuggets, in 1974.

References

External links
 NFL.com player page

1948 births
Living people
American football quarterbacks
Detroit Lions players
Mississippi State Bulldogs football players
Players of American football from Rhode Island
San Francisco 49ers players
Sportspeople from Newport, Rhode Island